Balázs Farkas (born 24 April 1988) is a Hungarian professional footballer.

Career
Farkas began his career with Nyíregyháza Spartacus and was here promoted to the first team in July 2004. After just one year on seniorside for Nyíregyháza Spartacus who played fifteen games and scores one goal signed in October 2005 with Dynamo Kyiv. Farkas has been loaned out to FC Fehérvár for the 2009/2010 season.

International career
He is also a member of the Hungary national football team and played his first match on 15 November 2006.

Honours
FC Dynamo Kyiv

Reserves
 Ukrainian Premier Reserve League: 2007–08
First Team
 Ukrainian Championship: 2006–07
runner-up: 2007–08
 Ukrainian Cup: 2006–07
runner-up: 2007–08
 Ukrainian Super Cup: 2007
 Channel One Cup: 2008

Videoton FC
Hungarian National Championship I: runner up 2009–10

References

External links
 Farkas' profile at Dynamo's official web page

1988 births
Living people
People from Nyíregyháza
Hungarian footballers
Association football forwards
Hungary youth international footballers
Hungary under-21 international footballers
Hungary international footballers
Nyíregyháza Spartacus FC players
FC Dynamo Kyiv players
Fehérvár FC players
Debreceni VSC players
Győri ETO FC players
Balmazújvárosi FC players
MTK Budapest FC players
Zalaegerszegi TE players
Soroksár SC players
Szombathelyi Haladás footballers
Kaposvári Rákóczi FC players
Nemzeti Bajnokság I players
Nemzeti Bajnokság II players
Ukrainian Premier League players
Hungarian expatriate footballers
Expatriate footballers in Ukraine
Hungarian expatriate sportspeople in Ukraine
Sportspeople from Szabolcs-Szatmár-Bereg County